Renneberg is a German surname. Notable people with the surname include:

Annett Renneberg (born 1978), German actress and singer 
David Renneberg (born 1942), Australian cricketer 
Heinz Renneberg (1927–1999), German rower

See also
Rønneberg

German-language surnames